Sturtevant station is an Amtrak railroad station in Sturtevant, Wisconsin, United States, which opened for service on August 14, 2006. It is located on East Exploration Court in the Renaissance Business Park off Wisconsin Highway 20. The facility accommodates travelers who use the Hiawatha Service between Chicago and Milwaukee, and sees fourteen daily arrivals, seven each from Milwaukee and Chicago. The Empire Builder also passes by this station, but does not stop. Located along tracks owned by the Canadian Pacific Railway through its American subsidiary the Soo Line Railroad, the station was constructed as a replacement for the former Milwaukee Road depot, which was moved from its former location to Caledonia in October 2009.

Service and facilities

The Sturtevant station's primary function is to provide residents of Racine, Kenosha and the southern portions of the Milwaukee metropolitan area with intercity service. The station is served only by the Amtrak Hiawatha Service, and sees fourteen daily arrivals, seven each from Milwaukee Intermodal Station and Chicago Union Station. The station is the second stop en route to Chicago,  from Milwaukee with a with a travel time of about 28 minutes. It is also the third stop en route to downtown Milwaukee, with a travel time along the  section taking one hour. In Amtrak's , the station handled  passengers.

The  station includes a Quik-Trak ticket kiosk, restrooms, a seating area and a pedestrian bridge to connect the northbound and southbound boarding platforms. As the station is unstaffed, all tickets from the station need to be either purchased in advance or from the Quik-Trak kiosk. The station parking lot contains 170 spaces, with payment required upon entering for daily use and a permit required for monthly use. Connections from the station to the local bus service operated daily by Ryde Racine are also available.

For much of the spring of 2020, it was temporarily a stop on the Empire Builder, a long-distance train connecting Chicago to the Pacific Northwest. The stop was added when the Hiawatha Service was suspended in the wake of the COVID-19 pandemic.

History

Prior to the completion of this facility, Amtrak served the former Milwaukee Road depot on Wisconsin Street in downtown Sturtevant. Due to the age and condition of the facility, in summer 1998 village officials applied for a federal grant for the construction of a new station. By November, initial construction costs for the facility were estimated at $1 million. Financing for the facility would come 80 percent through a state grant with the remaining 20 percent coming from the village. In July 2000, the original architectural plans were unveiled illustrating a   station, two side platforms, and a pedestrian tunnel crossing beneath the tracks. Additionally, construction costs were revised to $1.2 million with an estimated completion date of spring 2001.

Final approval for the construction of the station was given by the Sturtevant Village Board in April 2001, with completion slated for that November. By fall 2002, after both design changes and a delay in the receipt federal funding, construction was expected to commence. However, groundbreaking would again be delayed due to a disagreement between the village and the Canadian Pacific Railway regarding liability for what occurs on railroad property during construction. The issue was resolved by February 2003, with solicitation of bids for its construction being requested soon thereafter.

In May, costs for construction of the station were again increased to $4.1 million. The increased costs were primarily associated with the relocation of fiber optic lines during the construction of the pedestrian tunnel. To reduce overall costs, village officials asked for architects to remove the tunnel and replace it with an elevated walkway over the tracks. In October 2004, the village board gave final approval to the revised station plan with a pedestrian bridge. The $3.2 million estimated cost of the station was to be financed through a pair of federal transportation grants in addition to the village borrowing against its tax incremental financing district from the adjacent industrial park.

After nearly six years since it was initially proposed, ground was broken for the station in September 2005. The official dedication for the $3.2 million facility occurred on August 12, 2006, with Governor Jim Doyle, U.S. Representative Paul Ryan and Racine County Executive Bill McReynolds in attendance. Service would be discontinued at the 1901-depot the following day with the new facility opening for passenger service on August 14, 2006. The shuttered, 1901 station would subsequently be deconstructed and relocated to Caledonia between August and October 2009.

Statistics

References

External links

Sturtevant Amtrak Station, and Old Sturtevant Station (USA Rail Guide -- Train Web)

Amtrak stations in Wisconsin
Buildings and structures in Racine County, Wisconsin
Railway stations in the United States opened in 2006
Former Chicago, Milwaukee, St. Paul and Pacific Railroad stations